The Brit Award for Outstanding Contribution to Music is the Lifetime Achievement award given by the British Phonographic Industry (BPI), an organisation which represents record companies and artists in the United Kingdom. The accolade is presented at the Brit Awards, an annual celebration of British and international music. The honourees are determined by the Brit Awards voting academy with over one-thousand members, which comprise record labels, publishers, managers, agents, media, and previous winners and nominees.

History
The award was first presented in 1977 and was subsequently awarded annually from 1982 to 2010. The award has since been presented intermittently as the BRIT's Icon Award, with the original name being re-instated at the 2019 Brit Awards ceremony. Since 2000, the Classic BRIT Awards have also annually presented their own Outstanding Contribution to Music Award. The award was last presented under its original name at 2019 Brit Awards. However, the Global Icon Award, which was described as the BRIT's "highest accolade", and an international version of the BRIT's Icon Award, was presented in 2021 to Taylor Swift.

Elton John, Paul McCartney and John Lennon are the artists with the most wins with three awards. Pink is the first female solo artist and the first international artist to receive the BRIT award while Cecilia Bartoli and Andrea Bocelli are the first female soloist and international artist respectively to receive the Classic BRIT Award.

Contemporary winners

Classic winners

Artists with multiple wins
John Lennon has received the award three times (1977 and 1983 as a member of The Beatles and 1982 as a solo artist)
Paul McCartney has received the award three times (1977 and 1983 as a member of The Beatles and 2008 as a solo artist)
Elton John has received the award three times (1986 and 1995 for Outstanding Contribution and 2014 as a BRIT's Icon)
The Beatles have received the award twice (1977 and 1983)
Sting has received the award twice (1985 as a member of The Police and 2002 as a solo artist)
Freddie Mercury has received the award twice (1990 as a member of Queen and 1992 as a solo artist)
David Bowie has received the award twice (1996 for Outstanding Contribution and 2016 as a BRIT's Icon)
Robbie Williams has received the award twice (2010 for Outstanding Contribution and 2017 as a BRIT's Icon)

References

Brit Awards